The 1977 Atlanta Braves season was the 107th season for the franchise and their 12th in Atlanta. The team finished in last place in the six-team National League West with a record of 61–101, 37 games behind the Los Angeles Dodgers. The Braves hit a major league-leading seven grand slams.

All Braves home and away games were broadcast on WTCG-TV which during the offseason, under its owner Ted Turner, became the pioneer superstation in the United States and thus making the Braves the first MLB team to have its games telecast to millions of television viewers around the country aside from the national broadcasts on ABC and NBC which had been the case before the team's opening series of the season.

Offseason 
 November 17, 1976:  Gary Matthews was signed by the Braves as a free agent.
 December 9, 1976: Carl Morton, Adrian Devine, Ken Henderson, Dave May, Roger Moret, and $250,000 were traded by the Braves to the Texas Rangers for Jeff Burroughs.

Regular season

Turner's one-day reign as manager
Midway through the  season, with the Braves mired in a 16-game losing streak, owner Ted Turner sent Dave Bristol on a 10-day "scouting trip" and took over as his own manager.   This only lasted for one game (a 2–1 loss to the Pittsburgh Pirates) before National League president Chub Feeney ordered Turner to give up the reins, citing major league rules which forbid managers or players from owning stock in a team.  After the Braves broke the skid under third-base coach Vern Benson, Bristol—who had spent the time at his offseason home in Andrews, North Carolina—was given his old job back for the remainder of the season.

Notable events

September 15, 1977 - Dale Murphy hits two home runs in an 8–7 win over the San Diego Padres, the first home runs of his major league career.

Season standings

Record vs. opponents

Opening Day starters 
Jeff Burroughs
Vic Correll
Rod Gilbreath
Gary Matthews
Willie Montañez
Rowland Office
Pat Rockett
Jerry Royster
Dick Ruthven

Notable transactions 
 April 30, 1977: Mike Marshall was purchased from the Braves by the Texas Rangers.
 June 7, 1977: Larry Owen was drafted by the Braves in the 17th round of the 1977 Major League Baseball Draft.

Roster

Player stats

Batting

Starters by position 
Note: Pos = Position; G = Games played; AB = At bats; H = Hits; Avg. = Batting average; HR = Home runs; RBI = Runs batted in; SB = Stolen bases

Other batters 
Note: G = Games played; AB = At bats; H = Hits; Avg. = Batting average; HR = Home runs; RBI = Runs batted in; SB = Stolen bases

Pitching

Starting pitchers 
Note: G = Games pitched; IP = Innings pitched; W = Wins; L = Losses; ERA = Earned run average; SO = Strikeouts

Other pitchers 
Note: G = Games pitched; IP = Innings pitched; W = Wins; L = Losses; ERA = Earned run average; SO = Strikeouts

Relief pitchers 
Note: G = Games pitched; W = Wins; L = Losses; SV = Saves; ERA = Earned run average; SO = Strikeouts

Farm system

Awards and honors

League leaders 
Phil Niekro, National League leader, Losses

Notes

References 

1977 Atlanta Braves season at Baseball Reference
Atlanta Braves on Baseball Almanac

Atlanta Braves seasons
Atlanta Braves season
Atlanta